Scuticaria strictifolia is a species of orchid endemic to Brazil (São Paulo).

References

External links 

strictifolia
Endemic orchids of Brazil
Orchids of São Paulo (state)